Gao Yi (born 22 July 1998) is a Chinese volleyball player. She participated at the 2018 FIVB Volleyball Women's Nations League. and the 2018 Montreux Volley Masters.

Clubs
  Beijing (2016 - 2017)
  Bayi (2017–present)

References

1998 births
Living people
People from Zaozhuang
Volleyball players from Shandong
Chinese women's volleyball players
Middle blockers
21st-century Chinese women